The house at 176 South Main Street is a historic home located at Mount Morris in Livingston County, New York. The brick first story was built as a school in 1845.  It was enlarged and converted to a residence in 1900 in the Colonial Revival style.

It was listed on the National Register of Historic Places in 1999.

References

External links
House at No. 176 South Main Street - Mt. Morris, NY - U.S. National Register of Historic Places on Waymarking.com

Houses on the National Register of Historic Places in New York (state)
Colonial Revival architecture in New York (state)
Houses in Livingston County, New York
National Register of Historic Places in Livingston County, New York